Cristian Montero Fallas  (born 24 June 1982 in Alajuela) is a Costa Rican professional football player who currently plays for Herediano in the Costa Rican Primera División.

Club career
Montero started his career at Alajuelense in 2001 before moving to Herediano in 2009.

On 3 December 2019 Fútbol Consultants Desamparados confirmed, that 37-year old Montero would join the club for the 2020 season.

International career
Montero He also participated in the 2001 FIFA World Youth Championship in Argentina.

He made his senior debut for Costa Rica in a February 2005 FIFA World Cup qualification match against Mexico and earned a total of 6 caps, scoring no goals. He represented his country in 6 FIFA World Cup qualification matches.

His final international was an October 2009 World Cup qualification match against the United States.

References

External links
 
 

1982 births
Living people
People from Alajuela
Association football defenders
Costa Rican footballers
Costa Rica international footballers
L.D. Alajuelense footballers
C.S. Herediano footballers
A.D. San Carlos footballers
Liga FPD players